Raymond B. King (born 1965) is an American executive. Since 2010, he has been the president and CEO of Zoo Atlanta in Atlanta, Georgia.

Early life 
King was born in Atlanta on November 16, 1965. He attended Erskine College in Due West, South Carolina, later transferring to the Georgia Institute of Technology, where he was active in the Chi Phi fraternity. He graduated with a Bachelor of Science degree in management in 1987.

Career
King began his professional career at SunTrust Bank in 1988. His leadership positions included senior vice president of community affairs and corporate secretary of SunTrust Atlanta.

King was listed among Georgia Trend magazine's "Top 40 Under 40" in 2004 and was named on the Watch List of the Atlanta Business Chronicle's "25 Atlantans Making a Difference" in 2007. King was a recipient of the United Way Chairman's Award in 2009 and was named among the Atlanta Business Chronicle'''s "Most Influential Atlantans" in 2012.

King joined Zoo Atlanta on June 1, 2010, as president and CEO. His tenure has included a 50 percent increase in the zoo's annual attendance and capital campaigns to fund Scaly Slimy Spectacular: The Amphibian and Reptile Experience” and the “Grand New View” project which created a new African Savanna and 2 story special event venue overlooking it.  King has led Zoo Atlanta in raising over $65 Million in philanthropic support and over $60 Million in Public support, each well more than was raised in the 25 previous years as a private institution.

Awards and recognitions 
The Atlanta Business Chronicle named King “Most Admired Non-Profit CEO” 3 consecutive years (maximum allowed) in 2014-2016.  Atlanta Magazine named him one of the “500 Most Powerful Leaders” in 2018 and 2019.

Civic activities
King has been chair of six non-profit boards of directors, namely the Fernbank Museum of Natural History (2010), Regional Business Coalition, Committee for a Better Atlanta, Metro Atlanta Arts and Culture Coalition, Theatre in the Square, and Research Atlanta.

References

American nonprofit chief executives
American nonprofit executives
1965 births
Living people
21st-century American businesspeople
Businesspeople from Atlanta